Baptist beliefs are not completely consistent from one church to another, as Baptists do not have a central governing authority. However, Baptists do hold some common beliefs among almost all Baptist churches.

Since the early days of the Baptist movement, various denominations have adopted common confessions of faith as the basis for cooperative work among churches. These would include beliefs about one God, the virgin birth, the impeccability, miracles, vicarious atoning death, burial and bodily resurrection of Christ, the need for salvation (although the understanding of means for achieving it may differ at times), divine grace, the Church, the Kingdom of God, last things (Jesus Christ will return personally and visibly in glory to the earth; the dead will be raised; and Christ will judge everyone in righteousness), evangelism and missions.

In addition to the distinctive doctrines of Protestantism, Baptist theology in general is committed to a Zwinglian interpretation of the Eucharist or Lord's Supper and to the rejection of the theological validity and covenantal value of paedobaptism.  Many, but not all, Baptists hold to the Reformed doctrine that salvation cannot be lost following justification by faith alone.  Baptist beliefs are seen as belonging to three parties: General Baptists who uphold Arminian soteriology, Particular Baptists who uphold Calvinist soteriology, and Independent Baptists, who might embrace a strict version of either Arminianism or Calvinism, but are most notable for their fundamentalist positions on Biblical hermeneutics, family and the social order, and advocacy of "King James Onlyism."

Overview
The following acrostic acronym, spelling BAPTIST, summarizes Baptists' distinguishing beliefs:
 Biblical authority
 Autonomy of the local church
 Priesthood of all believers
 Two ordinances (believer's baptism and the Lord's Supper)
 Individual soul liberty
 Saved and baptized church membership
 Two offices of the church (elder and deacon)

Sometimes another "S" is added, making BAPTISTS:
 Separation of Church and State

Practices 
Baptists practice believer's baptism and the Lord's Supper (communion) as the two acts of faith-obedience to the example and commands given by Christ for Christians (Matthew 28:19; 1 Corinthians 11:23-26). Most Baptists call them "ordinances" (meaning "obedience to a command that Christ has given us") instead of "sacraments" (activities God uses to impart salvation or a means of grace to the participant). Therefore, historic Baptist theology considers that no saving grace is conveyed by either ordinance and that original sin is not washed away in baptism. Baptists have traditionally believed that they are symbols.

Many Baptists observe washing of feet as a third ordinance.  The communion and foot washing service is practiced regularly by members of the Separate Baptists in Christ, General Association of Baptists, Free Will Baptists, Primitive Baptists, Union Baptists, Old Regular Baptist, Christian Baptist Church of God.

Varying views 
Almost all Baptists hold their services and worship on Sunday. However, there is a group known as the Seventh Day Baptists whose origins are derived from Anabaptism and the pre-Reformation. Seventh Day Baptists gather and worship on the seventh day of the week on Saturday. A large portion of Seventh Day Baptists adopted the teachings of the Sabbath, which led to the formation of the Seventh-day Adventist Church.

Baptists are also viewed as the descendants of the Puritans who were shaped by the Anabaptists, thus the Baptist religion were considered an outcome of the Reformation. In the early 17th century, those individuals who called themselves Baptists broke apart from the Church of England. Some notable Puritan separatists included John Smyth and Thomas Helwys who were acknowledged as key founders of the Baptist denomination.

Furthermore, some Baptists (notably Landmarkists or "Baptist Bride" adherents) hold to a belief in perpetuity, which embraces the notion that the Baptist belief and practice existed since the time of Christ until today as the Church of Christ founded in Jerusalem was Baptist. Those who believe in perpetuity view the Baptist belief as not being a critical aspect of the Protestant Reformation.

Baptist theologians

See also
 Baptists in the history of separation of church and state
 List of Baptist confessions

References

Christian belief and doctrine
Beliefs